K. S. G. Venkatesh is an Indian actor and producer in the Tamil film industry. He is the son of director K. S. Gopalakrishnan. He acted in more than 50 films predominantly in Tamil film industry and more than 20 mega TV serials; around 2500 episodes. He started his career as a cameraman and producer for his debut TV serial Kattupattichatiram which was telecasted on Doordarshan in 1984-85. He later continued producing serials in Telugu which he was also the cameraman. In 1989 KSG was later introduced in the movie Athaimadi Methaiadi.

Partial filmography
All films are in Tamil, unless otherwise indicated.

Television

References

Male actors in Tamil cinema
Living people
Place of birth missing (living people)
1954 births